Bhale Huduga (Kannada: ಭಲೆ ಹುಡುಗ) is a 1978 Indian Kannada film, directed by T. R. Ramanna and produced by R. Ganesh. The film stars Vishnuvardhan, Manjula, Dwarakish and Udaykumar in lead roles. The film had musical score by G. K. Venkatesh.

The movie is a remake of 1964 Tamil movie Panakkara Kudumbam. Dwarakish essayed a triple role in this movie which was essayed by Nagesh in the Tamil version and Mehmood in the Hindi version Humjoli.The dual roles played by Nagesh in Anubavi Raja Anubavi  was earlier essayed by Mehmood in Hindi version (Do Phool) and Dwarakish in  Kannada version (Kittu Puttu).

Cast

Vishnuvardhan
Manjula
Dwarakish
Udaykumar
Thoogudeepa Srinivas
Raji
Chindodi Leela
Jayakumari
Jayamalini
Vanichandra
Shashikala
Sudhashree
Dikki Madhavarao
Chethan Ramarao
Kunigal Nagabhushan
Vasanthkumar
Master Ravishankar
Kunigal Ramamurthy
Pranayamurthy

References

External links
 
 

1978 films
1970s Kannada-language films
Films scored by G. K. Venkatesh
Kannada remakes of Tamil films
Films directed by T. R. Ramanna